Sue Anne Gilroy (born June 28, 1948) is an American politician who served as the Secretary of State of Indiana from 1994 to 2002. She was the Republican nominee for Mayor of Indianapolis in 1999, but she lost to Bart Peterson.

References

External links

1948 births
Living people
Secretaries of State of Indiana
Indiana Republicans